Juan Carlos Navarro is the name of:

Juan Carlos Navarro (basketball) (born 1980), Spanish professional basketball player
Juan Carlos Navarro (politician) (born 1961), Panamanian businessman, environmentalist and politician

See also
Carlos Navarro (disambiguation)
Juan Navarro (disambiguation)